Kukh-e Hajji Karim (also Romanized as Kūkh-e Ḩājjī Karīm; also kinown as Kūkh-e Ḩājj Karīm) is a village in Buin Rural District, Nanur District, Baneh County, Kurdistan Province, Iran. At the 2006 census, its population was 30, in 5 families. The village is populated by Kurds.

References 

Towns and villages in Baneh County
Kurdish settlements in Kurdistan Province